Paul Teather (born 26 December 1977 in Rotherham, South Yorkshire, England) is an English retired footballer who played in defence and midfield.

Career
Teather started his footballing career after taking a place at Lilleshall school of sporting excellence aged 14. While there, he played for the England national team at under-15 level, receiving his first cap for representing his country in an international game.

He begin his career as an apprentice with Manchester United upon leaving school in 1994, and turned professional in 1996. He remained at the club until being released on a free transfer in 2001.

In 1997–98, he was loaned out to Division Two side AFC Bournemouth, but his spell at Dean Court was curtailed by a triple cheekbone fracture.

After leaving Old Trafford, Teather had a spell with Northwich Victoria in the Nationwide Conference.

After football

Following his retirement from playing, Teather graduated from the University of Salford with a physiotherapy degree  and now works as physiotherapist. He started his new career with the Sheffield United first team, and now works for the Sheffield Steelers.

References

External links

1977 births
Living people
English footballers
Manchester United F.C. players
AFC Bournemouth players
Northwich Victoria F.C. players
Footballers from Rotherham
Association football physiotherapists
Alumni of the University of Salford
Sheffield United F.C. non-playing staff
Association football defenders
Association football midfielders